Ahsan Ullah Khan is a Pakistani football who plays as a right-back for Sui Southern Gas.

Khan won three consecutive league titles and three National Cup titles with Khan Research Laboratories.

Career

International
Khan started his international career with Pakistan U23 during 2014 Asian Games against Thailand U23, he made his second appearance China U23 in the Asian Games. Khan made his senior team debut in 2013 SAFF Championship against India, coming on as an 87th-minute substitute for Kaleemullah Khan, he made his second appearance against Nepal, coming on as an 89th-minute substitute for Hassan Bashir. He earned his first full cap in the final group stage game against Bangladesh.

Career statistics

References

Living people
1992 births
People from Quetta
Pakistani footballers
Pakistan international footballers
Association football defenders
Footballers at the 2010 Asian Games
Footballers at the 2014 Asian Games
Asian Games competitors for Pakistan